Cylicobdellidae is a family of leeches belonging to the order Arhynchobdellida.

Genera
The Interim Register of Marine and Non-marine Genera lists 2 genera as currently accepted in this family:
 Blanchardiella Weber, 1914
 Cylicobdella Grube, 1871

References

Annelid families
Leeches